In 1922 there were 13 lynchings in the American state of Texas. Of these 13 attacks, there were 15 people killed. Montgomery County, Texas had the most lynching with three, Thomas Early (May 17, 1922); Joe Winters (May 20, 1922); Warren Lewis (June 23, 1922).

Texarkana is a city that is bisected down the middle by the state borders of Texas and Arkansas. The west of the city is in Bowie County, Texas and the east is in Miller County, Arkansas. There was a lynching on the Arkansas side of Texarkana, when P. Norman was killed on February 11, 1922. The people involved most likely involved in the lynch mob came from the Texas side.

In 1922 United States there were 61 lynchings of which Texas had the most followed by Georgia (11) and Mississippi (8). In 1921 there were 64 people lynched in the United States with the top three states being Georgia (14), Mississippi (13), and Texas & Arkansas both having six lynching incidents.

The lynchings in 1922 Texas ranged from single incidents to the deaths of multiple people at the hands of the mob, like the Lynching in Kirvin, Texas where four people were killed. Some lynch mobs burnt their victims alive, others riddled their bodies with bullets or strung them up and hanged them from trees or lamposts.

African Americans weren't the only minority group in American impacted by lynchings. Texas was a very hostile place towards Mexicans after World War I. According to Lawrence A. Cardoso, right after World War I ended one Mexican national was lynched per week in the state of Texas.

Lynching in 1922 Texas
This table is from a report by the United States Senate Committee on the Judiciary.

See also
List of lynching victims in the United States

Annotations

Bibliography 
Notes

References 

 - Total pages: 23

1922 riots
1922 in Texas
African-American history of Texas
Lynching deaths in Texas
Protest-related deaths
Racially motivated violence against African Americans
Riots and civil disorder in Texas
White American riots in the United States